Come and Gone may refer to:
Joe Turner's Come and Gone, a play by August Wilson
"Come and Gone", a song by the Sword from the album Used Future